The seventh emergency special session of the United Nations General Assembly centred on the Palestine issue. It was held by the UN in 1980, convened by Senegal, and was the only special session to have been resumed besides the Tenth, which considered the same issue.

See also
 Emergency special session of the United Nations General Assembly

External links
 United Nations General Assembly Resolution ES-7/2 (July 29, 1980)

07
1980 in international relations
1980 in the United Nations